Rinkesta Castle is a castle at Eskilstuna Municipality in Södermanland, Sweden. Rinkesta is located in Ärla parish south of Norrsjön and north of Sörsjön.

History
Rinkesta was withdrawn from the crown in 1594 through a change to Privy Councillor (Kammarråd)  Gustaf Gabrielsson Oxenstierna  (1551-1597).
The main building was repaired after a fire in 1698. The current appearance was given to the castle during an extensive repair in 1775, during the ownership of Swedish Supreme Court marshal (Överstemarskalk) Thure Leonard Klinckowström  (1735-1821) who acquired the estate in 1768.

See also
List of castles in Sweden

References

Castles in Södermanland County